The Hilton Beirut Metropolitan Palace is a five-star hotel in Beirut, Lebanon. Located in the Sin el Fil district, the hotel has 195 rooms, 11 executive suites, 5 diplomatic suites, a presidential suite, a royal suite, an imperial suite and a penthouse suite.

The hotel contains a range of restaurants, notably Italian cuisine in the Venezia Restaurant and Oriental cuisine in the Summer Place. The Al Shindagah serves a range of international cuisine.

External links and references
Official site

Hotels in Beirut